Aïn Benian is a commune in Algiers Province and suburb of the city of Algiers in northern Algeria. As of the 2008 census, the commune had a population of 68,354.

El-Benian, is a coastal town situated in the region Algiers, Algeria.

Notable people

Sports
USMA Stadium

References

Suburbs of Algiers
Communes of Algiers Province